Laurence Campbell (1911–2001) was an Irish sculptor. He was the younger brother of the painter Christopher Campbell. Campbell was known for his busts for politicians and artists including Michael Collins and Maud Gonne, and his religious works. He was elected to the Royal Hibernian Academy in 1940. He also created limestone panels for buildings including the Marino vocational school and Theatre Royal, Dublin. He emigrated to the United States in the 1960s.

References

1911 births
2001 deaths
20th-century Irish sculptors